Runcu is a commune located in Vâlcea County, Muntenia, Romania. It is composed of seven villages: Căligi, Gropeni, Runcu, Snamăna, Surpați, Valea Babei and Vărateci.

References

Communes in Vâlcea County
Localities in Muntenia